Myocoptidae is a family of mites belonging to the order Sarcoptiformes.

Genera:
 Apocalypsis Bochkov, 2010
 Criniscansor Poppe, 1889
 Dromiciocoptes Fain, 1970
 Dromicioptes Fain, 1970
 Gliricoptes Lawrence, 1956
 Histiophorus Agassiz, 1846
 Myocoptes Claparède, 1869
 Sciurocoptes Fain, Munting & Lukoschus, 1969
 Trichobius Canestrini, 1896
 Trichoecius G.Canestrini, 1899

References 

Acari